Jarrell Huang Jun Rong (born 14 October 2000) is a Singaporean singer and songwriter. In 2018, he was crowned champion of the local singing competition SPOP Sing!. In 2020, he participated in the Chinese male group competition show We Are Young.

Early life
Huang studied at Maha Bodhi School and Chung Cheng High School.

Career
In 2007, Huang first participates in the first season of Singapore's game show The Sheng Siong Show during the children singing competition segment, in which he won. He then made his first child acting role in the 2009's drama Together.

In 2011, Huang finished ninth place on the eighth season of the Taiwanese reality talent show Chinese Million Star. He was the youngest contestant to become a Top 10 finalist. In 2014, he released his debut Mandarin EP, "Little Prince's Adventure". In 2017, he took part in the second edition of Chinese competition show Sound of My Dream.

In 2018, he took part and won in the first season of the Singaporean Chinese-language singing reality competition SPOP Sing!, organised by Mediacorp. In February 2020, Huang and local singer JJ Neo, co-wrote and sing a song titled The Light, a rally song launched by Mediacorp for COVID-19 pandemic.

In June 2020, he participated in the Chinese male group competition show We Are Young. He was voted out in the semi-final week and finished in 22nd place.

Filmography

Dramas Acted

Drama Songs

Awards and nominations

References 

2000 births
Living people
21st-century Singaporean male singers
Singaporean male television actors
Singaporean composers
Singaporean people of Chinese descent
Singaporean singer-songwriters